Cabir may refer to:

Cabeiri
Cabir (computer worm), an early Mobile virus